Andrea Bacchetti (born Rovigo, 4 July 1988) is an Italian rugby union player. His usual position is as a Wing and he currently plays for Rovigo Delta in Top12.

For 2012–13 Pro12 season, he named like Additional Player for Zebre.

In 2008 Bacchetti was named in the Italy Under 20 squad and in 2009 he is part of Italy squad for 2009 Six Nations.

References

External links 

It's Rugby France Profile
ESPN Profile

1988 births
Living people
Italian rugby union players
Italy international rugby union players
Rugby union wings
People from Rovigo
Rugby Rovigo Delta players
Zebre Parma players
Sportspeople from the Province of Rovigo